Adamas may refer to:

 Adamantas, a town in Greece
 Adamas (mythology), a character in the Iliad
 Adamas University, in Barasat, West Bengal, India
 Adamas International School, in Belgharia, Kolkata, India
 Adamas Institute of Technology, in Barasat, West Bengal, India
 Adamas (sawfly), an insect genus in the sawfly family Tenthredinidae
 Adamas (TV series), a 2022 South Korean television series

See also
 Adama (disambiguation)